Gaming law is the set of rules and regulations that apply to the gaming or gambling industry. Gaming law is not a branch of law in the traditional sense but rather is a collection of several areas of law that include criminal law, regulatory law, constitutional law, administrative law, company law, contract law, and in some jurisdictions, competition law. At common law, gambling requires consideration, chance and prize, legal terms that must be analyzed by gaming lawyers within the context of any gaming operation.

Gaming law is enormously complex. In the United States, it involves federal and state law considerations. In Canada, it involves federal and provincial law considerations, in a variety of legal disciplines.

United States

In the United States, illegal gambling is a federal crime if it is done as a business. However, each of its states has its own laws regarding the regulation or prohibition of gambling. States that permit such gaming usually have a gaming control board established to oversee the regulation of the industry, such as licensing of those employed in the gaming industry. States that permit casinos and similar forms of gaming often have strict zoning regulations to keep such establishments away from schools and residential areas.

Ukraine

Parliament outlawed gambling in 2009 after a May 2009, fire in a gambling hall in Dnipropetrovsk that killed nine people. The Ukrainian parliament passed the law "On Prohibition of Gambling Business in Ukraine" (Gambling Ban Law) banning gambling business and any participation in gambling in Ukraine on May 15. The President of Ukraine Viktor Yushchenko signed the law on June 23 and on June 25 it came into force. The Law On Prohibition of Gambling Business in Ukraine also applied to internet casinos, it did not apply to lotteries. The Parliament legalised gambling again on 14 July 2020, albeit with regulations and age restrictions (minimum age of 22).

Other jurisdictions
Gambling Act 2005 (UK)
Gaming Act 1845 (UK, repealed)
Interactive Gambling Act 2001 (Australia)
Macau gaming law
Gaming in Mexico

See also
Casino
Online gambling
Organized crime
Problem gambling
Underground poker

References

External links
Center for Gaming Research at the University of Nevada, Las Vegas; produces reports, papers, and a monthly update

 
Organized crime activity